The hundred of Wonford was the name of one of 32 ancient administrative units of Devon, England.

The parishes in the hundred were: 
 Alphington
 Brampford Speke
 Bridford
 Chagford
 Cheriton Bishop
 Christow
 Combeinteignhead
 Drewsteignton
 Dunsford
 East Ogwell
 The following Exeter parishes:
 Allhallows Goldsmith St.
 Allhallows on the Wall
 Bedford Precinct
 Cathedral
 Heavitree
 Holy Trinity
 St David
 St Edmund
 St George
 St John
 St Kerrian
 St Lawrence
 St Leonard
 St Martin
 St Mary Arches
 St Mary Major
 St Mary Steps
 St Olave
 St Pancras
 St Paul
 St Petrock
 St Sidwell
 St Stephen
 St Thomas the Apostle;
 Gidleigh
 Haccombe
 Hittisleigh
 Holcombe Burnell
 Huxham
 Pinhoe
 Poltimore
 Rewe (part)
 Shaldon
 South Tawton
 Sowton
 Spreyton
 Stoke Canon
 Stokeinteignhead
 Tedburn St Mary
 Throwleigh
 Topsham
 Upton Pyne
 West Ogwell
 Whitestone

See also 
 List of hundreds of England and Wales - Devon
 Wonford

References 

History of Exeter
Hundreds of Devon